Luigi Canina (Casale Monferrato, 1795 – Florence, 1856) was an Italian archaeologist and architect.

Luigi Canina, Italian architect and archeologist, was born in Casale Monferrato in 1795 and died in Florence in 1856. He was a pupil of Ferdinando Bonsignore in Turin, and settled in Rome in 1818. Among his works are: some construction at the Villa Borghese (monumental neoclassical propylaea from Piazzale Flaminio); Casino Vagnuzzi outside of Porta del Popolo in Egyptian style; not realized projects for reconstruction of the sanctuary of Oropa (1856). He became professor of architecture at Turin, and his most important works were the excavation of Tusculum in 1829 and of the Appian Way in 1848, the results of which he embodied in a number of works published in a costly form by his patroness, the queen of Sardinia. In 1843, he was elected into the National Academy of Design as an Honorary member.

Canina is also noted for his studies of history and archeology: Ancient architecture described and represented in documents (1830–44). A column opposite the basilica of Saint Sebastian on the Appian Way close to Rome records Canina's work in rescuing many Roman ruins and turning the road into the archeological park that it is today.

In England he restored interiors at Alnwick Castle, Northumberland.

Partial Anthology

References

 Sistri, Augusto, ed. Luigi Canina, 1795–1856: Architetto e Teorico del Classicismo. Milan, 1995.
Alnwick Castle

Italian archaeologists
19th-century Italian architects
1795 births
1856 deaths
People from Casale Monferrato
Academic staff of the University of Turin
Recipients of the Royal Gold Medal